KZDF-LD, virtual and VHF digital channel 8, is a low-powered SonLife-affiliated television station licensed to Santa Barbara, California, United States. The station is owned by HC2 Holdings.

History 
The station’s construction permit was issued on May 29, 1998 under the calls of K51FF. On February 3, 1999, it changed to K67HE, then K08MP. On April 4, 2006, it moved to the call sign KZDF-LP. Finally, on May 28, 2020, the station changed its call letters to KZDF-LD.

Digital channels
The station's digital signal is multiplexed:

References

External links

Low-power television stations in the United States
Innovate Corp.
ZDF-LD
Television channels and stations established in 2001
2001 establishments in California